Alexander Devereux  was a 16th-century bishop in Ireland to 1555.

He was the last Abbot of Dunbrody Abbey. An appointment of, Henry VIII he was consecrated Bishop of Ferns at St Patrick's Cathedral, Dublin on 14 December 1539. He died in post at Fethard-on-Sea in 1566.

References

16th-century Anglican bishops in Ireland
Bishops of Ferns
1566 deaths